San Pedro Airport  is an airport that serves Bonanza, Nicaragua.

The airport was very important to the establishment of gold mining operations in the 1940s and 1950s.

Airlines and Destinations

See also

 Transport in Nicaragua
 List of airports in Nicaragua

References

External links
 HERE/Nokia - Bonanza
 OurAirports - San Pedro
 OpenStreetMap - Bonanza

Airports in Nicaragua
North Caribbean Coast Autonomous Region